Graffiti is the third studio album by American singer Chris Brown. It was released on December 8, 2009, by Jive Records. The album serves as a follow-up to his previous album Exclusive (2007). Recording sessions took place from 2008 to 2009, with several record producers, including Polow da Don, Swizz Beatz, the Runners and Brian Kennedy, among others.

Primarily an R&B outing blended with pop and hip hop, Graffiti incorporates elements of goth rock, synthpop and Eurodisco, with its production showing a heavy usage of synthesizers. Its lyrical content has been described as two-sided, with its themes varying from remorseful regret, desire, affection and a playboy lifestyle.

The album debuted at number seven on the US Billboard 200, selling 102,000 copies in its first week. In 2019 the album was certified gold by the Recording Industry Association of America (RIAA). The album became his third consecutive top-ten debut in the United States following Exclusive in 2007, while producing two singles that has achieved moderate chart success. The album was considered to be a critical and commercial failure compared to the singer's previous works, with many speculating that the reason was Brown's scandal of domestic violence happened the same year of the album's release.

Despite receiving generally negative reviews from most music critics, Graffiti was nominated for two Grammy Awards; including one for the Best Contemporary R&B Album and the other for the Best R&B Performance by a Duo or Group with Vocals for this track, "Take My Time" featuring Tank.

Background
In 2008, Chris Brown commenced work on his third studio album and confirmed the title, Graffiti, at the 2008 American Music Awards. In 2008 he said that with this album he wanted to experiment with a different musical direction inspired by singers Prince and Michael Jackson. He stated, "I wanted to change it up and really be different. Like my style nowadays, I don't try to be typical urban. I want to be like how Prince, Michael and Stevie Wonder were. They can cross over to any genre of music". Brown, with this album, started to take full control of his art, entirely managing the artistic direction, and writing every song of the album (with the exception of the song "I'll Go", written and produced by Brian Kennedy and James Fauntleroy). 
Brown said that his decision to entirely direct and write his albums and songs came from the fact that he wanted to give "my own perspective of the music I wanted to make" and by his wanting to "verbalize whatever I was going through". Following the domestic violence scandal involving the singer and Rihanna on February 8, 2009, Brown decided to express his emotional state caused by that happening on a big part of the album.

Recording for the album primarily took place in Orlando and on September 5, 2009, via Twitter, Brown announced that he had completed the album, and also revealed that the album would be released outside of the US on December 7 and in the US on December 8. Speaking to MTV, Swizz Beatz revealed, "he's got something to prove," and that for the album Brown "has worked on 60–70 songs."

Composition

The album's musical style is made by mixtures of R&B, synth pop, rock and Euro-disco. Critics noted that with the album's sound Brown aimed to expand his music beyond the genres of his previous works. Greg Kot of Chicago Tribune said that Brown "borrows from the cross-genre experiments of Kanye West, Saul Williams, and Lil Wayne." According to Mikael Wood of Los Angeles Times, the album is made of an "upbeat" part, that "can be considered the sonic sequel to "Forever"", mixed with power ballads, observed to express his remorse and feelings following the Rihanna incident.

Lead single and album's opener "I Can Transform Ya", lyrically is about introducing someone to a luxurious life, has a robotic synth rock groove, characterized by a heavy use of synthesizers and guitar riffs. "Pass Out" featuring Eva Simons, a Eurodisco song, samples the "Call on me" on Steve Winwood's "Valerie", which was also used in Eric Prydz worldwide dance hit, "Call on Me". The song has been compared to Lady Gaga's works. "Sing Like Me" and "Take My Time" recall Brown's earlier R&B works in a more sexually oriented way. "Fallin' Down is a goth rock and synthpop song, that features lyrics about Brown falling in depression. The uptempo electro-hop "Wait", with The Game and R&B singer Trey Songz, features "bouncy sirens", and according to Jon Caramanica of The New York Times is closest to capturing the "frenetic energy" of Brown's early singles. The song has been described as a sexual braggadocio record. According to Dan Gennoe of Yahoo! Music UK, "I.Y.A" is a tribute to 80's music, and the song has been compared to Blake Lewis' "Heartbreak on Vinyl".

"So Cold" has been described as a "piano-laden apology" as "Famous Girl" has been called a "heavy hearted dance track." The previous track as well as "Crawl" feature an apologetic Brown, pining at points. The previous has been described to bear a sonic resemblance to Madonna's "Drowned World/Substitute for Love." The latter, "Famous Girl", features new wave influences and a bouncy, light melodic line. The song references songs such as Drake's "Best I Ever Had", Keri Hilson's "Knock You Down", Keyshia Cole's "Heaven Sent", Beyoncé's "Halo", and Jazmine Sullivan's "Bust Your Windows", as well as Rihanna's "Disturbia" and his "Forever", as Brown laments on writing the first song and tells Rihanna that he "should've known that you would break my heart / should've known that you would leave me lonely". "Take My Time" is an R&B slow jam that features American singer Tank, and has slow drums, and heavy female breathing, prompting innuendo. Jon Caramanica of The New York Times said that "Lucky Me", lyrically about downs of life in the limelight, has a melody reminiscent of Michael Jackson's "Man in the Mirror". The song is an acoustic R&B and pop record that features minor influences of African music. "Girlfriend" is a synth rock song featuring Lupe Fiasco. The album's standard edition ends with the track "I'll Go", a soft rock track where the singer "tells the story of a lost love" and his determination to do anything for his loved one, including leaving her if that could make her happier.

Release and promotion

Walmart controversy
The week of the album's release, Brown took to his Twitter page to express his extreme displeasure with stores that are not visibly stocking the album, including a Walmart in Wallingford, Connecticut, stating: "The[y] didnt even have my album in the back… not on shelves, saw for myself, im tired of this shit. major stores [are] blackballing my cd. [They are] not stockin the shelves and lying to costumers. what the fuck do i gotta do. im not biting my tongue about shit else… the industry can kiss my ass. WTF… yeah i said it and i aint retracting shit... we talked to the managers and the[y] didnt even know anything. wow!!! but they had Alicia Keys album ready for release for this tuesday comin … the manager told me that when there are new releases its mandatory to put em on the shelves.. BUT NO SIGN OF #GRAFFITI. BS. no disprespect to alicia at all, just givin an example to whos album is loaded and ready to go next week".

Packaging and cover art
The album was released internationally on December 7, 2009, and in the US on December 8, 2009. It was released on all major formats and, in addition to the standard edition, an extended deluxe edition was also released, containing an additional six songs. The international edition differs slightly from the US edition, with one extra song ("Girlfriend") appearing on the standard edition and another ("Chase Our Love") appearing on the deluxe extended edition with the inclusion of track ("Movie") omitted. The European deluxe edition was issued as a single-CD, while US and Japanese deluxe editions are two-disc sets. The album cover displays Brown with robotic hands, wearing black clothing and sunglasses, holding a guitar over his shoulder, and spray-painting the album title, which is written in a font similar to that of Purple Rain by Prince and the Revolution. To promote the album, Brown embarked on the "Fan Appreciation Tour" on October 27, 2009, in New Jersey. The tour took place in the US. The tour ended on December 15, 2009, in New York and a portion of the proceeds from the tour went to charity to help the victims of domestic violence as well as people with developmental disabilities.

Singles
"I Can Transform Ya" was released as the album's lead single on September 29, 2009. The song received mostly positive reviews, noting the song's club feel and catchiness. "I Can Transform Ya"'s reached the top ten of New Zealand, whilst achieving chart success in Australia, the United Kingdom and the United States. The song's dance-heavy accompanying music video features choreography with hooded ninjas, and makes puns on the Transformers series. "Crawl" and "Sing Like Me" were released on iTunes on November 24, 2009, the first as the album's second single, and the latter as a promotional single. The previous received positive to mixed reviews, reaching the top twenty in Japan and New Zealand. Its accompanying music video features Brown and American R&B singer Cassie as his love interest, as he yearns for their relationship on a winter night in a city and in a desert scene. The song "Pass Out" was planned to be the third single for the album, but was not released. Other singles "Burning Up" and "Not My Fault" (which was produced and features vocals by Pharrell Williams) were also planned for the album, but not included.

Other songs

"I Love U" serves as the 5th bonus track to the deluxe version of the album and features vocals from Ester Dean.

"Brown Skin Girl" serves as the 6th and final bonus track to the deluxe version of the album and features vocals from Jamaican dancehall artist Sean Paul and duo Rock City. It is a Jamaican dancehall track inspired by Sean Paul, produced by Rock City and sees Chris Brown adopt a Caribbean accent for the track.

Critical reception

Graffiti received negative reviews from most music critics. At Metacritic, which assigns a normalized rating out of 100 to reviews from mainstream critics, the album received an average score of 39, based on 12 reviews, which indicates "generally unfavorable reviews". It is the lowest-rated album of 2009 on Metacritic.

Steve Jones of USA Today gave the album two-and-a-half out of four stars and commented that Brown "succeeds in expanding his sonic horizons with rock and Euro-dance influenced rhythms that are sure to ignite dance floors and innervate his electrifying performances". Billboards Gail Mitchell complimented its music as "a forward-moving fusion of R&B, pop, rock and Euro-dance". Thomas Golianpoulous of Spin said Brown sounded "remorseful", ending the review by saying "The album's most striking moment is 'Fallin' Down.' Over an ominous guitar riff, the 20-year-old sings, 'It's getting heavy / I think I'm getting ready to break down.' It's the most honest moment of his short career. The kid sure needs a vacation." Despite writing that it has filler tracks, Dan Gennoe of Yahoo! Music gave the album a seven out of 10 rating and called it the "highest point of his career". Chicago Tribune writer Greg Kot noted an "inconsistent and sometimes contradictory tone" in Brown's lyrics, but commented that the album has "several top-notch pieces of innocuous dance music". Leah Greenblatt of Entertainment Weekly complimented its "zero-gravity pleasures", writing that "at its best moments, it still floats". Sarah Rodman of The Boston Globe commended the music and production, but criticized Brown's songwriting. Joey Guerra of the Houston Chronicle said the album might have worked, but much of it "never takes flight, instead recycling the usual slick touches and arrangements." BBC Online's Jude Rogers noted "slinky RnB body-poppers and cheesy, breathy ballads" and commented that "plodding melodies draw attention to Brown's unpleasantly macho style".

Rolling Stone writer Jody Rosen expressed a mixed response towards its "punchy dance-pop songs full of club-ready beats and Casanova gestures", calling it "a bland, occasionally obnoxious, pro forma R&B album". Slant Magazines Eric Henderson commented that "the only compelling thing about the incoherent Graffiti is the material (both external and internal) that makes it even less palatable than a simply below-average collection of paint-by-numbers R&B beats." Michaelangelo Matos of The A.V. Club gave the album an F rating and stated "The production is clean and often lively, and Brown sings well enough. The problem is what he's singing". AllMusic editor Andy Kellman also dismissed the album's songwriting and called Brown "exceptionally insufferable" on most of the songs. Chicago Sun-Times writer Jim DeRogatis gave the album one out of four stars and described it as "thoroughly mediocre". Pete Paphides of The Times panned its ballads, called them a "slopfest of mawkish penitence". Jon Caramanica of The New York Times questioned the lyrics' substance and called Graffiti "a curiously electro-moon double faced album that largely thumbs its nose at close reading".

Commercial performance
The album debuted at number seven on the US Billboard 200, selling 102,000 copies in its first week. Graffiti was the week's second highest debut, only behind Glee: The Music, Volume 2. To date, the album has sold 341,000 copies in the United States. The sales were disappointing compared to his previous two albums, but was still certified Gold by the RIAA less than ten years later, on August 23, 2019.

Track listing

Sample credits
"Pass Out" contains a sample of "Call on Me" performed by Eric Prydz.
"Movie" contains replayed elements of "Can You Stand the Rain" performed by New Edition.
"Brown Skin Girl" contains replayed elements from "You're the Inspiration" by Chicago.

Charts

Weekly charts

Year-end charts

Certifications

Release history

References

External links
 Graffiti at Discogs
 Graffiti at Metacritic

2009 albums
Chris Brown albums
Albums produced by Brian Kennedy (record producer)
Albums produced by Free School
Albums produced by Polow da Don
Albums produced by Ryan Leslie
Albums produced by the Messengers (producers)
Albums produced by the Runners
Albums produced by Scott Storch
Albums produced by Swizz Beatz
Albums produced by Tha Bizness
Jive Records albums